Revolución 12.111 is the third studio album by Spanish metal band Hamlet. Zero was created to release this album. The LP was recorded, produced and mixed by Tom Morris.

Track listing
 J.F.
 Razismo es desigualdad
 Poseer bajo sumisión
 Egoísmo
 No me jodas
 El color de los pañuelos
 Creerse Dios
 La tierra de Paco
 Legalizar
 El pequeño dictador
 Crónica Antisocial
 La pesadilla
 Habitación 106
 Hombre del 2000
 No invasión

Personnel 
J. Molly – vocals
Luis Tárraga – lead guitar
Pedro Sánchez – rhythm guitar
Augusto Hernández – bass, chorus
Paco Sánchez – drums

External links 
Review of the album in zona-zero.net
Info of the album

1996 albums
Hamlet (band) albums